Siegfried Pank (born 24 March 1936) is a German cellist and viol player. He was a member of the Gewandhausorchester in Leipzig from 1962 to 1980, and toured with the Neues Bachisches Collegium Musicum. He turned to playing the viol in historically informed performance, and lectured cello and viol at the Musikhochschule Leipzig from 1984, as professor from 1988 to 2001. He was a co-founder of the International Telemann Association in 1991, serving as its president from 2012.

Life 
Plank was born in Salzwedel, Saxony-Anhalt. His father was a bridge-building engineer and amateur musician, and his great-grandfather was the Leipzig superintendent . He grew up in Danzig, Pomerania. In 1944, he was brought to Borna, where he received piano and cello lessons. From 1948 to 1952, he attended the Landesschule Pforta, and afterwards until 1954 at the Thomasschule zu Leipzig where he was a member of the Thomanerchor conducted by Günther Ramin.

Pank studied cello at the Musikhochschule Leipzig with August Eichhorn until 1959. From 1960, he was first solo cellist in the new orchestra of the Musikalische Komödie in Leipzig. He became a member of the Gewandhausorchester in 1962, serving as deputy solo cellist from 1973. He remained active as a soloist and chamber musician. He toured with the Neues Bachisches Collegium Musicum. Wieland Kuijken and Jordi Savall pointed him at playing the viol in historically informed performance.

In 1980, Pank left the orchestra and took up a teaching position at the Musikhochschule, as a lecturer from 1984, and as professor of cello and viol from 1988. In 1991, he founded an Early music (Alte Musik) department there. He became emeritus in 2001, but still lectured until 2006. He has held seminars and master classes. He has published about performance practice and interpretation of music of the 17th and 18th centuries. He is also a member of the jury at the Deutscher Musikrat as well as at several international competitions, such as the International Johann Sebastian Bach Competition in Leipzig, the Bach-Abel Competition in Köthen and the Magdeburger Telemann-Festtage. He was a co-founder of the International Telemann Association in 1991, and became its president in 2012.

Pank lives in Markkleeberg near Leipzig.

Awards 
On 10 September 2008, Pank received the Brandenburg Bach Society's Honorary Prize during a concert at the Bachtage Potsdam, in honour of his artistic, musicological and pedagogical services to Bach and for his commitment to the festival.

In recognition of the distribution of Telemann's works, Pank received the Magdeburg Telemann Prize in 2012.

On 7 October 2018, Pank was awarded the Order of Merit of Saxony-Anhalt by the minister-president, Reiner Haseloff, at the opening of the 7th Bach-Abel Competition in the Bachsaal of Schloss Köthen.

References

Further reading 
 Hans-Rainer Jung: Das Gewandhaus-Orchester. Seine Mitglieder und seine Geschichte seit 1743.  Mit Beiträgen zur Kultur- und Zeitgeschichte von Claudius Böhm, Faber und Faber, Leipzig 2006, .
 Unkraut jäten, damit man nicht den Überblick verliert... Interview mit Prof. em. Siegried Pank anlässlich seines 70. Geburtstages. In JOURNAL Zeitschrift der Hochschule für Musik und Theater "Felix Mendelssohn Bartholdy" Leipzig, Nr. 21, Sommersemester 2006. 
 Werner Wolf: Siegfried Pank 75. Ein Leben für Cello, Gambe und Alte Musik. In the Leipziger Volkszeitung, 24 March 2011, .

External links 
 
 
 
 Internationale Telemann-Gesellschaft (in German)

1936 births
Living people
People from Salzwedel
People from the Province of Saxony
German classical cellists
German viol players
German performers of early music
Academic staff of the University of Music and Theatre Leipzig